The 2015 Superettan, part of the 2015 Swedish football season, was the 15th season of Superettan, Sweden's second-tier football league in its current format. The 2015 fixtures were released in December 2014. The season began on 3 April 2015 and ended on 1 November 2015. A total of 16 teams contested the league.

Teams
A total of 16 teams contest the league. The top two teams qualify directly for promotion to Allsvenskan, the third has to play a play-off against the fourteenth team from Allsvenskan to decide who will play in Allsvenskan 2016. The bottom two teams qualified directly for relegation to Division 1, the thirteenth and the fourteenth has to play a play-off against the numbers two teams from Division 1 Södra and Division 1 Norra to decide who will play in Superettan 2016.

2014-champions Hammarby IF and runner-up GIF Sundsvall were promoted to the Allsvenskan at the end of the 2014 season. They were replaced by Mjällby AIF and IF Brommapojkarna. Landskrona BoIS and Husqvarna FF were relegated at the end of the 2014 season after finishing in the bottom two places of the table. They were replaced by Division 1 Norra champions AFC United and Division 1 Södra champions Utsiktens BK. Östers IF was also relegated after losing the relegation play-offs to Division 1 Norra runner-up IK Frej.

Stadia and locations

 1 According to each club information page at the Swedish Football Association website for Superettan.

Personnel and kits

Note: Flags indicate national team as has been defined under FIFA eligibility rules. Players and Managers may hold more than one non-FIFA nationality.

Managerial changes

League table

Playoffs
The 13th-placed and 14th-placed teams of Superettan meets the two runners-up from 2015 Division 1 (Norra and Södra) in Two-legged ties on a home-and-away basis with the team from Superettan finishing at home.

Örgryte IS won 2–1 on aggregate.

IK Frej won 2–0 on aggregate.

Positions by round

Results

Season statistics

Top scorers

Top assists

Top goalkeepers
(Minimum of 10 games played)

Hat-tricks

References

External links 

  

2015 in Swedish association football leagues
Superettan seasons